The next Japanese general elections are scheduled on or before 31 October 2025, as required by the constitution. Voting will take place in all Representatives constituencies including proportional blocks, in order to appoint Members of Diet to seats in the House of Representatives, the lower house of the National Diet of Japan. As the cabinet has to resign after a general House of Representatives election in the first post-election Diet session (Constitution, Article 70), the lower house election will also lead to a new designation  election of the Prime Minister in the Diet, and the appointment of a new cabinet (even if the same ministers are re-appointed).

Political parties

Opinion polls

Reapportionment
The electoral district will be readjusted according to the results of the 2020 Japan census. Originally, it was intended to readjust in the last election, but it was held in the existing constituencies not long after the census results came out.

Newly created seats
Ten new districts and three new block seats will be created.
 1. Tokyo-26th
 2. Tokyo-27th
 3. Tokyo-28th
 4. Tokyo-29th
 5. Tokyo-30th
 6. Kanagawa-19th
 7. Kanagawa-20th
 8. Saitama-16th
 9. Aichi-16th
 10. Chiba-14th
 11. 18th Tokyo block seat
 12. 19th Tokyo block seat
 13. 23rd Minami-Kanto block seat

Seats to be eliminated
Ten districts and three block seats will be eliminated.

 1. Hiroshima-7th
 2. Miyagi-6th
 3. Niigata-6th
 4. Fukushima-5th
 5. Okayama-5th
 6. Shiga-4th
 7. Yamaguchi-4th
 8. Ehime-4th
 9. Nagasaki-4th
 10. Wakayama-3rd
 11. 13th Tohoku block seat
 12. 11th Hokurikushinetsu block seat
 13. 11th Chugoku block seat

See also
 Proposed Japanese constitutional referendum

Notes

References

Future elections in Japan
General elections in Japan